Count Anton Bogdanovich de Balmen was a Russian general of Scottish origin, Governor-General of Kursk and Oryol, commander of the Russian Caucasian corps.

Biography 
A member of the de Balmens, his father came to Russia during the reign of Empress Anna and entered the Russian service as a major. Since childhood, Anton de Balmen was enlisted in the Preobrazhensky Life Guards Regiment. In 1758 he was an ensign, three years later a lieutenant colonel.

He participated in the Russian-Turkish war in 1770, as commander of the Rostov Carabinieri Regiment, where he distinguished himself during the assault on Bendery and the capture of the Perekop fortifications and the city of Kaffa by storm. Rose to the rank of Major-General in 1774. He served in the army in Ukraine, participated in the liquidation of the Zaporozhian Sich. He was promoted to Lieutenant-general in 1780.

In 1784, de Balmain was appointed director of First Cadet Corps. From 1786 to 1789 he was the Governor-General of Kursk and Oryol. On November 20, 1786, he was awarded the Order of St. George of the 4th degree. 

He was appointed commander of Russian Caucasian corps from May to October 1790, during the war with Ottoman Empire, where, after the unsuccessful expedition of General Yuri Bibikov to Anapa, matters were in extremely poor condition. De Balmen arrived in the Caucasus completely ill with consumption and died on October 4, 1790 in Georgievsk. Among other awards, Balmen had the Order of St. Alexander Nevsky.

Family 
He was married to Countess Elena Antonovna de Vieira, granddaughter of Peter I's associate Anton de Vieira (1682-1745). For the merits of Count de Balmen, Empress Catherine II granted his widow 500 serfs and several thousand acres of land, and placed the children in educational institutions at public expense. They had several children:

 Alexander Antonovich (1781-1848), was brought up in the First Cadet Corps. He was a Russian commissar under Napoleon I during his stay on the island of St. Helena in 1815-1821. His notes were placed in the "Russian Archive" for 1868. He was married to Glafira Nikolaevna Svistunova (1801-18?). Grandfather of Elizabeth Augustovna Shar (1858-1888), wife of the artist Vasily Surikov (1848-1916).
 Sofya Antonovna (d. 1822), graduate of the Smolny Institute, married to M. S. Kozlovsky (1774-1853).
 Elena Antonovna, a graduate of the Smolny Institute.
 Karl Antonovich (1786-1812), major general, died of wounds in Vilna.
 Pyotr Antonovich, graduate of the Corps of Pages.
 Yakov (1813-1845), was an adjutant of General Alexander von Lüders and died in the Caucasus in the Dargin expedition of 1845
 Sergei (1816–?), a close friend of Taras Shevchenko, was arrested in 1848 and was under police surveillance.
 Alexander (1819-1879), commanded the 3rd Brigade of the 2nd Guards Cavalry Division in the Russian-Turkish war of 1877-78

Sources 

 
 

1741 births
1790 deaths
Russian people of Scottish descent
Russian generals
Recipients of the Order of St. Anna, 1st class
Recipients of the Order of St. George of the Fourth Degree
People of the Caucasian War
People of the Russo-Turkish War (1768–1774)